First Presbyterian Church is a historic Presbyterian church at 175 East Main Street in Smithtown, Suffolk County, New York. It is sheathed in wood shingles and covered by a gable roof. It features an engaged, square tower surmounted by a tiered, balustraded belfry. The tower has a Palladian window at its second level.

The church was added to the National Register of Historic Places in 1977.

References

External links

Presbyterian churches in New York (state)
Churches on the National Register of Historic Places in New York (state)
Historic American Buildings Survey in New York (state)
Churches completed in 1825
19th-century Presbyterian church buildings in the United States
Churches in Suffolk County, New York
National Register of Historic Places in Smithtown (town), New York